Walter Kempler is a psychotherapist.

Like many of the early family therapy theorists, psychoanalytic training was also the starting point for Walter Kempler; he later became interested in existential issues and family therapy. He worked for a time with Fritz Perls, and there is much overlap in their orientations. Kempler calls his form of treatment, variously, Experiential or Gestalt family therapy. His focus is on the immediate, on feelings and desires that lie behind verbal and nonverbal messages, and on their clear and complete delivery.

Full engagement of family members is his immediate goal, which in turn supports his overall goal, the experience of life, its ongoing flow of union and separation.

“Neither separateness nor union is the goal of the therapeutic process, but rather the exhortation of the endless and often painful undulation between them”.

A family is made up of members who need and seek both union and separation from each other. The task of the therapist is to reconcile emerging and often conflicting personal desires, to “arouse (remind) forgotten desires; to fire up abandoned conflict; and to keep all combatants at the front until everybody wins”. Winning, of course, does not mean that everybody is satisfied with the result, but rather, the resulting satisfaction, compromise, or loss, is fully felt, with no residuals; for example, if someone must give up a cherished fantasy about their relationship, this loss must not only be realized, but experienced and fully grieved.

Experience is essential for Kempler. He sees his approach as “oriented to an exploration of the resistances to experience”. He is quite clear in asserting that experience, action, is the key to producing change. The therapist can lead or push people toward experience, but wherever possible must not usurp the experiencing, but let the momentum created carry the participants into the intimate experience of each other, and their own desires, needs and fantasies. “Desire, clearly expressed and movingly delivered, brings change in its wake, sometimes through fulfillment, sometimes through the expression alone”. For Kempler, change results from confronting and fully experiencing reality in the here and now, leading to the acceptance of one’s, and other’s, continual movement toward and away from union.

The Kempler Institute
In 1979, the Kempler Institute was founded by the American psychiatrist and family therapist Walter Kempler, MD, in collaboration with child psychiatrist Morgens A. Lund, Proff. Lis Keiser, and family therapist Jesper Juul, with the objective of developing a long-term postgraduate education in experiential psychotherapy with families.

The general office is situated in Odense, and the Institute owns educational facilities in Odder, Copenhagen, and a conference center on Hjarnø, Denmark.

The Institute works primarily in Denmark, Scandinavia, and other European and central European countries.

References

American psychiatrists
American psychotherapists
Family therapists
Living people
Year of birth missing (living people)